is a 1989 horizontally scrolling shoot 'em up arcade game developed and published by Data East. This game is third of Data East's 'Evolution Trilogy': first being Darwin 4078, second being SRD: Super Real Darwin. Unlike two predecessors, this game is a scrolling-platform run-n'-gun type game instead of vertical shooter.

Gameplay 
It features a cyborg battling against alien creatures, while collecting power-ups and defeating bosses to advance levels.

Reception 
In Japan, Game Machine listed Act-Fancer: Cybernetick Hyper Weapon on their June 15, 1989 issue as being the sixth most-successful table arcade unit of the month.

References

External links 
Act-Fancer: Cybernetick Hyper Weapon at Data East Games
Act-Fancer: Cybernetick Hyper Weapon at arcade-history

1989 video games
Arcade video games
Arcade-only video games
Data East video games
Run and gun games
Shoot 'em ups
Video games about cyborgs
Video games developed in Japan
Data East arcade games